Truth is a demo album released by Christian rock singer and Stryper frontman, Michael Sweet. The album was independently produced by Sweet and released in 1998 under his own label.

The album was sold through Sweet's website and did very well selling over 10,000 units, prompting several labels to seek rights to release it. The album was re-released two years later (see Truth (2000 version)).

Two of the songs ("One" and "Rain") were not included in the 2000 version.

Track listing
All songs written by Michael Sweet, except where noted:
 "Truth" (Sweet, Joel Christian) - 4:48
 "I Am Adam" (Sweet, Christian) - 4:29
 "Blue Bleeds Through" (Sweet, Paul Heusman) - 4:22
 "Wool & Chiffon" - 4:45
 "Lift My Head" (Sweet, Heusman) - 4:15
 "One" (Sweet, Christian) - 5:36
 "Achilles Heel" (Sweet, Christian) - 3:52
 "Rain" (Sweet, Heusman) - 3:28
 "Distracted" (Sweet, Heusman) - 4:58
 "Stone" (Sweet, Christian) - 5:01

Personnel
 Michael Sweet - lead vocals, acoustic and electric guitars
 Kenny Lewis - drums and percussion
 Chris Miles - bass guitar
 Rob Graves - additional acoustic guitars
 Rob Keith - guitar solo on "Distracted"
 Taylor Armerding- mandolin on "One"
 Muzzy - drums
 Philip Bynoe - bass guitar
 Steve Hunt - organ and strings
 Deddrick Terry - piano and strings
 Pete Vantine - piano and orchestrations on "Stone"
 Gigi Abraham - additional vocals on "One"
 Nick Ventresca - additional background vocals on "Truth

References

1998 albums
Michael Sweet albums